Jeremiah Johnson may refer to:

Jeremiah Johnson (film), a 1972 American western film
Jeremiah Johnson or Nullsleep (born 1980), American electronic musician and computer artist
Jeremiah Johnson (blues musician) (born 1972), American blues singer, guitarist and songwriter
Jeremiah Johnson (gridiron football) (born 1987), American and Canadian football running back
Jeremiah Johnson (mayor) (1766–1852), mayor of Brooklyn, New York
Jeremiah Johnson, American soldier killed in the Tongo Tongo ambush
Liver-Eating Johnson (1824–1900), mountain man of the American old west
Jeremiah Johnson, American christian revivalist "prophet" and Donald Trump supporter

See also
Jerry Johnson (disambiguation)

Johnson, Jeremiah